Greg Morris (1933–1996) was an American actor.

Greg Morris may also refer to:

Greg Morris (organist) (born 1976), English organist
Greg Morris (Canadian football) (born 1992), Canadian football player
Greg Morris (politician) (born 1964), American state legislator

See also 
 Craig Morris (born 1968), American classical trumpeter